Thomas Francis Dennehy (May 12, 1899 – August 8, 1977) was a Major League Baseball left fielder who played for one season. He played for the Philadelphia Phillies for nine games during the 1923 Philadelphia Phillies season.

External links

1899 births
1977 deaths
Philadelphia Phillies players
Major League Baseball left fielders
Baseball players from Pennsylvania